Frank McPherson (27 February 1896 – 13 August 1969) was an  Australian rules footballer who played with St Kilda in the Victorian Football League (VFL).

Notes

External links 

1896 births
1969 deaths
Australian rules footballers from Victoria (Australia)
St Kilda Football Club players